Niall Annett (born 7 May 1991) is an Irish professional rugby union player for Bath, having previously played for Worcester Warriors and Ulster Rugby. His favoured position is hooker.
In the 2011 junior Rugby Championships, Annett captained the Ireland U20 team.
In 2014, he was called up to the Barbarians squad to play against Leicester Tigers.

On 1 March 2022, Bath Rugby announced that Annett would be joining the club from the start of the 2022/23 season.

References

Ulster Rugby players
Worcester Warriors players
Bath Rugby players
1991 births
Living people
People educated at Methodist College Belfast
Rugby union hookers
Rugby union players from Belfast